Randall University is a Christian university in Moore, Oklahoma. Founded in 1917, it offers associate, bachelor's, and master's degrees. It is one of several higher learning institutions associated with the Free Will Baptists. Randall University is also a member of the Oklahoma Independent Colleges and University. In 2015, it had an enrollment of 365.

Location and description
Randall University is located on a 41-acre campus adjacent to  Interstate  35,  in the city of  Moore.  The University has a  multimillion-dollar plant which includes the  John  H.  West  Administration  Building composed of classrooms and administrative offices; 4 student dormitories housing approximately  120 students and living quarters for the dormitory supervisor: Willey  Hall, Barnard Hall, Friends Hall, and Yandell Hall; Oller Annex, a  science lab/classroom; 16  single bedroom apartments: Randall Hall and Palmer Hall, 8 units each; an activities building consisting of a  student center, campus bookstore, offices, fitness training center, and a gymnasium; the Geri Ann Hull Learning Resource Center/Classroom  Building;  a  faculty duplex,  and the Hillsdale  House (missionary residence).  The  Bill  J.  and Alma Lou Barber Conference Center is on the east side of the quad (Administration, Library/Classroom, Activity, and Conference Center Building). The Barber Conference  Center contains an  850  seat auditorium,  a recital hall, a cafeteria, classrooms, and offices.

Biography of Benjamin Randall
Benjamin Randall (February 7, 1749 – October 22, 1808) was converted during the Great Awakening as a result of the preaching ministry of George Whitfield. Rev. Randall served in the New Hampshire militia during the American Revolutionary War. The first Benjamin Randall biographer, quoted Rev. Randall’s journal in recounting his conversion experience: 
“I saw in Him (Jesus) a universal love, a universal atonement, a universal call to mankind, and was confident that none would ever perish, but those who refused to obey it (Buzzell, John. The Life of Elder Benjamin Randel, principally taken from documents written by himself. Limerick, ME: Hobbs, Woodman, and Co. 1827).” 
Rev. Randall’s theological departure from the Calvinistic norm of his era occurred at the point of his conversion. Today Free Will Baptists are known for believing John 3:16 to be literally true, that God’s love sent Jesus to die for the sins of humanity so that everyone no matter what tribe, nation, or language has the opportunity to respond to saving grace through faith in Jesus Christ. 
Rev. Randall went on to found a church in New Durham, New Hampshire that we now recognize as the first Free Will Baptist Church in New England. Rev. Randall was instrumental in planting more than 50 churches throughout the region in his 28 years as a circuit riding preacher. The churches were organized into quarterly and yearly meetings that became a force in the revivals of the nineteenth century, missions, and education. 
Benjamin Randall is recognized as the leader of the Free Will Baptists, an indigenous American religious movement which ordained persons of color and women in the early days of the nineteenth century. The Free Will Baptists (also known as Free, General, Open Communion, and Antislavery Baptists) were aggressive church planters on the American frontier and embraced missions among immigrant and freedmen populations, as well as, spreading the gospel internationally. Randallite Free Will Baptists were known for their opposition to slavery forming anti-slave societies, prohibiting slave owners from holding membership in the church, and publicly promoting abolition through the “Morningstar” (the official newspaper of the movement). 
In addition, Free Will Baptists founded non-discriminatory institutions of higher education admitting men and women of different ethnic backgrounds such as: Bates College, ME (1855); Hillsdale College, MI (1844); Storer College, WV (1865); and Tecumseh College (1917), OK. Tecumseh College was the first Free Will Baptist College out of the Randall movement west of the Mississippi. Randall University traces its roots back to Tecumseh College.

Academics
Randall University offers eleven academic programs across three schools (School of Arts and Sciences, School of Christian Ministry, and School of Education). Randall offers two fully online Master's degrees: Master of Arts in Ministry and Master of Public Administration. Additionally, the School of Professional Studies offers fully online, adult degree completion options in four undergraduate majors.

Randall University was granted an exception to Title IX in 2017, allowing the school to legally discriminate against LGBT students for religious reasons.

School of Arts and Sciences 

 Associate in Arts (AA)
 Business Administration (BS) with concentrations in:
 Business Management
 Public Administration
 Sports Management
 Exercise Science (BS)
 Letters (BA)
 Multidisciplinary Studies (BA)
 Psychology (BS)

School of Christian Ministry 

 Christian Ministry (BA) with concentrations in:
 Pastoral Ministry
 Theology
 Youth and Family Ministry
 Intercultural Studies (BA)
 Ministry & Business (BA)
 Worship & Music Studies (BA)

School of Education 

 Teacher Education (BS) with concentrations in:
 Elementary Education
 Secondary Education – Mathematics
 Secondary Education – Social Studies
 Secondary Education – Business*
 Secondary Education – English*   *Alternative Certification

School of Professional and Graduate Studies 

 Business Administration (BS) with concentrations in:
 Business Leadership
 Public Administration
 Christian Ministry (BA) with concentrations in:
 Ministry and Leadership
 Worship Studies
 Ministry & Business (BA) – Professional Studies
 Multidisciplinary Studies (BA)
 Master of Arts in Ministry (MA)
 Master of Public Administration (MPA)

Athletics
Randall University features six varsity sports teams which compete in the Association of Christian College Athletics (ACCA) and the National Christian College Athletic Association (NCCAA). The student-athletes are known as the Saints or the Lady Saints, for male and female competitors, respectively. The Saints and Lady Saints represent Randall in the following varsity sports:

Men's sports

Women's sports

Baseball
The Randall University Saints have won five national championships since 1999 and produced four national championship runner-up appearances during the same span.
 NCCAA II National Championships
 1999, 2000, 2002, 2003, 2011
 National Championship runner-up
 2004, 2005, 2007, 2008

Men's basketball
Throughout its history, the Saints have won nine national championships and four regional championships.
 NCCAA Division II National Championship 
 2016
 2017
 ACCA National Championships
 1989, 1990, 1991, 1992, 1999, 2000, 2007, 2011
 NCCAA Division II Regional Championships
 1996, 1999, 2002, 2011

Women's basketball 
The Lady Saints won the ACCA national championship in the 2006, 2007, 2012, 2013, 2014 national tournaments.

Women's volleyball 
The Lady Saints won the ACCA national championship in 2010 and 2016, coached by 30 under 30 winner Dave Ulrich.

References

External links
 Official website

Baptist universities and colleges in the United States
Bible colleges
Free Will Baptists
Private universities and colleges in Oklahoma
Association of Christian College Athletics member schools
Transnational Association of Christian Colleges and Schools
Educational institutions established in 1959
Education in Cleveland County, Oklahoma
Buildings and structures in Cleveland County, Oklahoma
1959 establishments in Oklahoma